Ali Sarp Levendoğlu (born 25 December 1981) is a Turkish actor and director.

Levendoğlu started acting at the age of six. After studying at Saint-Benoît French High School, he studied visual communication design at Istanbul Bilgi University before getting a degree in acting from Istanbul Kültür University. As the nephew of director Mustafa Altıoklar, he started his acting career by taking part in his uncle's works. He was cast in a number of TV series, including Lise Defteri, Çınaraltı, Emret Komutanım, and Zeliha'nın Gözleri as well as movies such as O Şimdi Asker and Emret Komutanım Şah Mat. Levendoğlu also worked as a director in the TV series Emret Komutanım and Gece Gündüz. Between 2014–2015, he had a leading role in the series Küçük Ağa. In 2017, he began starring in the action series Savaşçı, portraying the character of Haydar Bozkurt.

Filmography

References

External links 
 
 

Living people
1981 births
Turkish male television actors
Turkish male film actors
Istanbul Bilgi University alumni
Male actors from Ankara